William Hutchinson was an art director. He was nominated for an Academy Award in the category Best Art Direction for the film Young Winston.

Selected filmography
 The Dirty Dozen (1967)
 Young Winston (1972)

References

External links

Art directors
Year of birth missing
Year of death missing